Duvalius doriae, the Doria's cave beetle, is a species of beetle belonging to the family Carabidae.

Etymology
This species, the first blind beetle found in Italy, was discovered in 1858 in the cave of Cassana in the Eastern Liguria by the Italian naturalist Giacomo Doria and by the geologist Giovanni Capellini. The French entomologist Leon Fairmaire named this species Anophthalmus doriae in honor of Giacomo Doria.

Subspecies
There are two subspecies:
 Duvalius doriae doriae (Fairmaire, 1859) 
 Duvalius doriae liguricus (Dieck, 1869)

Description
This cave predator ground beetle has no wings or functional eyes.

Distribution
This species is endemic to Italy.

References

External links
 Image on Diomedia

Trechinae
Cave beetles
Beetles of Europe
Endemic fauna of Italy
Beetles described in 1859
Taxa named by Léon Fairmaire